Fingercuff Productions aka Fingercuff was a British film production company specialising in short films and corporate promos. Their work was broadcast on numerous channels such as MTV, ITV, Channel AKA, Propeller TV, Channel 4, screened at BAFTA and also shown at film festivals around the world. The company was founded in 2000 by filmmakers James Webber and Jamie Hooper.

Filmography

Collaborations

Fingercuff collaborated on short films with actors such as Kate Dickie, Neil Maskell, Derek Jacobi, Julian Glover, Anna Walton, Sian Breckin, James Alexandrou, Sam Gittins, Tim Blackwell, Debra Baker, Charlotte Mounter, Ben Wigzell, Olivia Chappell, Stuart Sessions, David Avery, Paula Gilbert, Harry Macqueen and Francesca Fowler. Fingercuff co-produced with Neil Marshall the short film The Halloween Kid (dir. Axelle Carolyn). Fingercuff have created promos for Clogau Gold, Amnesty International, Disney, Oakley Photography and the Film4 London FrightFest Film Festival.

References

Film production companies of the United Kingdom